
Lac de Sanetsch (also Lac de Sénin, German: Sanetsch See) is a reservoir below Sanetsch Pass in Valais, Switzerland. The Sanetsch dam was built in 1965.

See also
List of mountain lakes of Switzerland

External links
Swiss Dams: Sanetsch

Lakes of Valais
Reservoirs in Switzerland